Allan Green (born 1979) is an American boxer.

Allan Green may also refer to:

 Allan Green (barrister) (born 1935), British barrister
 Allan Green (botanist), New Zealand botanist
 Allan Green (cricketer) (born 1960), English cricketer

See also
 Allen Green (born 1938), American football player
 Allan Green Conservatory, a botanical display facility in Perth, Western Australia
 Alan Green (disambiguation)